Sebastian Steyer (born 18 February 1980) is a Polish professional darts player, entrepreneur and former footballer who played as a defender in local football club. Currently plays in World Darts Federation (WDF) and occasionally in Professional Darts Corporation (PDC) events. He reached a semi-finals at the 2019 BDO World Trophy.

Career
Steyer started playing darts in 2000. At first he treated it as entertainment, and over time he began to succeed in more serious tournaments. After five years, however, due to business matters, he had a long over 10-years hiatus from playing and returned in 2017 with some national success. He tried to play football as a defender in local football club Chemik Kędzierzyn-Koźle, but injuries of knee thwarted his plans. He won with his team Opole Region Championship.

Right at the beginning of his international darts career in 2018, he reached a semi-finals in Polish Open. In the next part of the season, he unsuccessfully tried to qualify for the PDC World Darts Championship, lost in semi-finals of Eastern Europe Qualifier. Highly success season allowed him to qualify for the 2018 Winmau World Masters. In this tournament he advanced to the fifth round defeating along the way Arwyn Morris, Tokuyo Takayama, Jitse van der Wal and Jason Lovett. In fifth round match he lost to Richard Veenstra 0–3 in sets.

After the quarter-finals at the Hungarian Masters in 2018, Steyer was also able to win prize money at other tournaments and tried his hand at the PDC Q-School for the first time in 2019. Despite two rounds of 16, it was just not enough for the PDC Tour Card. In the same year, at the Greek Open, Steyer played his first WDF tournament final, but lost to Thibault Tricole 3–6 in legs. Few weeks ago he reached the final in the Polish Open, but this time lost to Toon Greebe 3–6 in legs. In June 2019, he played in the 2019 Czech Darts Open, but lost in the first round to Chris Dobey 2–6 in legs.

Due to his good results, the Pole qualified for the 2019 BDO World Trophy, where he was able to knock-out Ross Montgomery 5–3 in legs in the first round. Victory over Scott Mitchell 5–4 in legs in the second round was also quite surprising and in the quarter-finals he beat Roger Janssen 6–4 in legs. After an even duel, he lost in semi-finals to Richard Veenstra 4–7 in legs. In January 2020, Steyer has started at the 2020 BDO World Darts Championship. He had to admit defeat in first round match to Mario Vandenbogaerde 0–3 in sets.

In February 2020, he reached his third WDF tournament final at the Slovak Open, unfortunately lost to Chris Landman 1–6 in legs. Quite good results achieved locally throughout the 2020 and 2021 season allowed him to qualify for the 2022 WDF World Darts Championship. However, he lost in the first round match to James Richardson 1–3 in sets.

Personal life
Steyer have car rental company. His son Marcel is a volleyball player in ZAKSA Kędzierzyn-Koźle, but he also playing darts.

World Championship results

BDO/WDF
2020: First round (lost to Mario Vandenbogaerde 0–3) (sets)
2022: First round (lost to James Richardson 1–2)

Performance timeline

References

External links

1980 births
Living people
Polish darts players